Grindelwald may refer to:

Grindelwald, a village at the foot of the Wetterhorn in Switzerland
Grindelwald, Tasmania, Australia
Gellert Grindelwald, a fictional character in the Harry Potter series of books

See also
 Grinderwald, in the Hanover Region and the Lower Saxon district of Nienburg/Weser, Germany